Gamma Phi Gamma was a local fraternity, founded in 1907 at Wilmington College in Ohio. In later years it claimed to be America's oldest surviving local fraternity.

Gamma Phi Gamma was permanently banned from the Wilmington College campus in 2014 after a pledge lost a testicle in a hazing incident. The organization is now dormant.

References

Local fraternities and sororities
Wilmington College (Ohio)
Fraternities and sororities in the United States